The black-headed parrotbill (Psittiparus margaritae) is a bird species often placed with the Old World babblers (family Timaliidae) or in the Sylviidae, but it actually seems to belong to the distinct family Paradoxornithidae.

It is found in eastern Cambodia and southern Vietnam. Its natural habitat is subtropical or tropical moist montane forests.

References

 Robson, C. (2007). Family Paradoxornithidae (Parrotbills) pp. 292 – 321   in; del Hoyo, J., Elliott, A. & Christie, D.A. eds. Handbook of the Birds of the World, Vol. 12. Picathartes to Tits and Chickadees. Lynx Edicions, Barcelona.

black-headed parrotbill
black-headed parrotbill
Birds of Cambodia
Birds of Vietnam
black-headed parrotbill